Beautiful Machines (2005) is the debut album of the Pinoy rock band, Pupil. It was released on November 10, 2005 under Sony BMG, the same music company that publishes the  Eraserheads' music. The band itself describes their music as "dark, loud, and romantic." It is very guitar-driven, stripped down, and the album has a very distinct sound, considering that it is the band's debut album. The album was recorded digitally at Wombworks in Marikina. “We didn't use amps at all,” says frontman Ely Buendia. The band had its official Album Launch Party on January 31, 2006 at the Mugen Bar Metrowalk. The band also mentioned in an interview with Animax, that the album was greatly influenced by sci-fi.

Pupil's initial plan with Beautiful Machines album was to produce it with then-Rivermaya frontman Rico Blanco. But due to Blanco's very hectic schedule, Blanco was not able go in with the project. The production then continued with the help of Patrick Tirano, who plays guitars for both Rugis and Monkeyspank.

Pupil worked on Beautiful Machines for five months. “Maganda rin na kami-kami kasi nagkakaalaman pa lang kami kung ano magiging tunog namin (It's good that we're just doing it by ourselves because we're still discovering our sound that time)” says Yan in an interview.

Track listing

Trivia
The album was mastered at Tweak Merville by Zach Lucero, drummer of the band, Imago and was recorded digitally at Wombworks in Marikina, the studio founded by Louie Talan of Razorback and Kapatid.
The group's manager and Ely Buendia's wife at that time, Diane Ventura, did the vocals for the title track "Beautiful Machines" 
"Mary" is inspired by The Beatles' "Let It Be" while "Lost Guide" is inspired by My Bloody Valentine's "Sometimes."
There are rumors that the song "Blow Your House Down" has been inspired by The Three Little Pigs, a fairytale / childhood story, but this hasn't been confirmed by the band. This song is one of Hoodwinked!'s soundtrack.
Jerome "J. Astro the boy who fell on earth" Velasco from The Mongols, The Teeth and Daydream Cycle, played additional Guitar and Keyboards for the song "Beautiful Machines". He also jammed with the band during the Beautiful Machines album launch.
Pupil's first single, “Nasaan Ka?” is the 3rd track of the Beautiful Machines album. “Dianetic”, their second single is track no. 12 and track no. 9 is “Dulo Ng Dila”, which happens to be their third single. Their 4th single, “Gamu-Gamo” is track no.6. All of the said singles have track numbers that are divisible by 3.
The music video of “Nasaan Ka?” was filmed entirely on location in an old resort called “Tropical Palace” in BF Parañaque.
Pupil's carrier single, "Nasaan Ka?" was titled "Wala Ka Na" during the period when The Mongols was about to produce their "second" album.
The album also featured photography by Ryan Agoncillo.

References

2006 debut albums
Pupil (band) albums